Charles Culbertson Robertson (January 31, 1896 – August 23, 1984) was an American professional baseball player. He played in Major League Baseball as a pitcher, and is best remembered for throwing a perfect game in 1922. He was the last surviving player who played at least one game for the 1919 Chicago White Sox, having died in 1984.

Robertson was born in Dexter, Texas, grew up in Nocona, Texas, and graduated from Nocona High School in 1915. Charles attended Austin College from 1917 until 1919. He began his career with the Chicago White Sox in 1919 at the age of 23. Robertson was an average player for most of his career, having a career record of 49–80 and never winning more than he lost during a single season. His main pitch throughout his career was a slow curveball which he often threw on the first pitch to a batter on any side of the plate, followed by a fastball up in the zone.

Perfect game

On April 30, 1922, in just his fourth career start, he pitched the fifth perfect game in baseball history against the Detroit Tigers at Navin Field (later known as Tiger Stadium) in Detroit. He became the first pitcher in major league history to throw a perfect game on the road. The Detroit lineup featured such Hall of Famers as Ty Cobb and Harry Heilmann, who both complained that he was doctoring the ball throughout the game. A spectacular diving catch by Johnny Mostil on a liner to left by Bobby Veach in the second inning preserved the historic feat. The Tigers submitted several game balls to American League President Ban Johnson after the game to check for irregularities, but Johnson dismissed the charge. No pitcher would equal the feat after Robertson for another 34 years, until Don Larsen in the 1956 World Series; the next regular season perfect game would not come until Jim Bunning's perfect game in 1964.

After the victory, he suffered arm troubles for the rest of his career.

Post professional life
Robertson was a contestant on What's My Line? on October 14, 1956. His occupation at the time of his television appearance was a buyer and seller of pecans. His appearance was six days after Don Larsen's perfect game in the 1956 World Series. He died in 1984 in Fort Worth, Texas, at age 88.

See also

Pitchers who have thrown a perfect game

References

External links

Box score for Robertson's perfect game

1896 births
1984 deaths
Austin Kangaroos baseball players
Major League Baseball pitchers
Chicago White Sox players
St. Louis Browns players
Boston Braves players
Sherman Browns players
Minneapolis Millers (baseball) players
Milwaukee Brewers (minor league) players
Dallas Steers players
Baseball players from Texas
Major League Baseball pitchers who have pitched a perfect game
People from Cooke County, Texas
People from Nocona, Texas